Donald George McLaren  (21 August 1933 – 5 November 2014) was a New Zealand businessman specialising in equine pharmaceuticals.

Biography
Born in the Auckland suburb of Epsom in 1933, McLaren founded Bomac Laboratories, an animal remedies company, in 1958. The company, which held 154 patents, 55 inventions and registered 360 products in New Zealand, was sold to German company Bayer in 2010.

McLaren was also active in the thoroughbred racing industry.  He established Northfields Stud near Karaka, served on the committee of the Auckland Racing Club from 1980 to 1999 including a term as president from 1995 to 1999, and was patron of the New Zealand racing hall of fame.

McLaren was inducted into the New Zealand Business Hall of Fame in 1999. In the 2000 New Year Honours, McLaren was appointed an Officer of the New Zealand Order of Merit for services to the animal health industry and racing. He was promoted to Companion of the same order in the 2014 New Year Honours. In 2013 he was awarded an honorary DSc degree by Massey University.

He died in Auckland on 5 November 2014.

References

1933 births
2014 deaths
People from Auckland
New Zealand businesspeople
New Zealand racehorse owners and breeders
New Zealand referees and umpires
Companions of the New Zealand Order of Merit